Louise Herschman Mannheimer (3 September 1845 - December 17, 1920) was a Czech-American Jewish author, poet, school founder, and inventor. Mannheimer was the founder of the Cincinnati Jewish Industrial School for Boys. She held patents for several devices. She was the inventor of the "Pureairin" Patent Ventilator.

Biography
Louise Herschman was born at Prague, Bohemia, 3 September 1845. Her parents were Joseph Herschman and Katherine Urbach.

Herschman Mannheimer was educated at St. Teine School, privately, and at Normal School, Prague, and University of Cincinnati.

In 1866, she went with her parents to New York City, and three years later, married Sigmund Mannheimer (1835-1909). As the wife of Professor Mannheimer, she strongly seconded his teaching and communal work, both in Rochester, New York and in Cincinnati, Ohio, but made time for literary labors.

She wrote poems, articles, and reviews for German and English periodicals. She was the author of, How Joe Learned to Darn Stockings, and other juvenile stories. Zimmermann's Deutscli in Amerika (Chicago, 1894) contains some of her poems and a short biographical notice. Among her productions in English are "The Storm," a translation of one of Judah Halevi's poems, and "The Harvest," a prize poem (printed in The American Jews' Annual, Cincinnati, 1897). In 1895, she published under the title of "The Jewish Woman" a translation of Nahida Remy's "Das Ji'idische Weib" ("The Jewish Woman") (second edition, 1897). She was the author of "The Maiden's Song". 

Herschman Mannheimer worked as a director of a private school, in Prague; teacher of a Sabbath School, Congregation Berith Kodesh, in Rochester; and teacher, Mrs. Leopold Weil's School, New York City. She was the inventor of the Pureairin Patent Ventilator; and founder and president, Boys' Industrial School, Cincinnati. She served as president of the German Women's Club, Rochester; was a contralto at the Temple Ahawath Chesed, New York; and Sabbath School teacher, at Temple Shaare Emeth, St. Louis, Missouri.

She was a speaker at 1893 World's Columbian Exposition Congress of History and Congress of Religions, in Chicago; and for Mothers' Meetings, in Cincinnati. She a featured speaker at the Jewish Women’s Congress (1893) on the topic of "Jewish Women of Biblical and Mediaeval Times".

Herschman Mannheimer and her husband lived in Baltimore, New York City, St. Louis, and Rochester before settling in Cincinnati where he taught at the Hebrew Union College. They had two sons, Eugene and Leo, who both became rabbis, and two daughters, the dramatist and elocutionist Jennie Mannheimer (Jane Manner), and the elocutionist Edna B. Mannheimer (Edna B. Manner). Mannheimer died in New York, December 17, 1920.

Notes

References

Attribution

Bibliography

External links
Louise Herschman Mannheimer at Jewish Encyclopedia
 

1845 births
1920 deaths
20th-century Czech poets
Czech women poets
American women poets
Founders of schools in the United States
Writers from Prague
19th-century American inventors
20th-century American women writers
Women inventors
Elocutionists
Women founders
School founders